The 1974 Irish presidential election resulted from the sudden death in office of President Erskine H. Childers. Cearbhall Ó Dálaigh was elected unopposed as the fifth president of Ireland.

Nomination process
Under Article 12 of the Constitution of Ireland, a candidate for president could be nominated by:
at least twenty of the 204 serving members of the Houses of the Oireachtas, or
at least four of 31 councils of the administrative counties, including county boroughs.

Agreed candidate
Initially all parties privately agreed to nominate the late president's widow, Rita Childers. Before she was informed of the plan, however, a mix-up led to the collapse of the arrangement. A partially deaf Fine Gael Teachta Dála, identified in some reports as Tom O'Donnell, confirmed the secret arrangement upon mishearing a journalist's question asking about the decision of a local council's nomination of Childers as president, having assumed that the cross-party decision was made public. Fianna Fáil leader Jack Lynch, thinking the party was set up, subsequently withdrew from the agreement and nominated Cearbhall Ó Dálaigh instead. The parties agreed to the new arrangement due to a number of external factors, including a sluggish economy and The Troubles.

Ó Dálaigh had served as Attorney General from 1951 to 1953, as a judge of the Supreme Court from 1953 to 1973, as Chief Justice from 1961 to 1973, and had been serving as a judge of the European Court of Justice from 1973 at the time of his nomination. All parties agreed to Ó Dálaigh's nomination. As no other candidate was nominated, it was not necessary to proceed to a ballot for his election.

Result

Ó Dálaigh was inaugurated as president on Thursday, 19 December 1974.

References

1974 elections in the Republic of Ireland
Presidential
Presidential elections in Ireland
Uncontested elections
November 1974 events in Europe